Simon Oscar Charlie Fernholm (born March 6, 1994) is a Swedish professional ice hockey defenceman, currently playing for Scottish club Fife Flyers in the UK's EIHL. He is the younger brother of Daniel Fernholm. He was selected 164th overall by the Nashville Predators in the 2012 NHL Entry Draft.

Playing career
Fernholm made his Elitserien début with Frölunda HC on October 28, 2012, in a 6–3 road win against AIK IF, he had a primary assist on the game-winning goal.

In the following 2013–14 season, Fernholm was hampered by a knee injury which limited him to just 16 games with the J20 squad.

On May 26, 2014, Fernholm left Frölunda in order to gain regular playing time and agreed to a one-year deal with IF Troja/Ljungby of the Hockeyettan.

After spells with fellow Swedish clubs AIK IF, Timrå IK, HC Vita Hästen, Västerås IK, in August 2022 Fernholm agreed to join UK Elite Ice Hockey League (EIHL) side Fife Flyers for the 2022–23 season.

Career statistics

References

External links

1994 births
Living people
AIK IF players
Fife Flyers players
Frölunda HC players
Nashville Predators draft picks
Ice hockey people from Stockholm
Swedish ice hockey defencemen
Swedish expatriate sportspeople in Scotland
Expatriate ice hockey players in Scotland
Swedish expatriate ice hockey people
Timrå IK players
IF Troja/Ljungby players
VIK Västerås HK players
HC Vita Hästen players